Vance is a masculine given name which may refer to:

People:
Vance Amory (born 1949), Premier of Nevis
Vance Bourjaily (1922–2010), American novelist, playwright, journalist and essayist
Vance D. Brand (born 1931), NASA astronaut
Vance Breese (1904–1973), American aviation engineer and test pilot
Vance Dixon (1901-?), American musician 
Vance Hartke (1919–2003), American politician
Vance Johnson (born 1963), American retired National Football League player and long jumper
Vance Joy (born 1987), Australian singer songwriter
Vance Law (born 1956), American Major League Baseball former player and former head baseball coach at Brigham Young University
Vance McAllister (born 1974), American politician
Vance C. McCormick (1872–1946), American politician and businessman
Vance Packard (1914–1996), American author
Vance Palmer (1885–1959), Australian writer
Vance Randolph (1892–1980), American folklorist and author
Vance Rodriguez, Hiker who was found dead in Florida in 2018
Vanče Šikov (born 1985), Macedonian footballer
Vance Wilson (born 1973), American retired Major League Baseball catcher
Vance Worley (born 1987), American Major League Baseball pitcher
Vance Archer, ring name of pro wrestler Lance Hoyt

Fictional characters:
Vance Astro, Marvel Comics superhero born Vance Astrovik
Vance Astrovik, Marvel Comics superhero formerly known as Marvel Boy

See also
Vance (surname)

Masculine given names